William Cotton may refer to:

 William Cotton (artist) (1880–1958), American artist and playwright
 William Cotton (MP for Cambridgeshire), see Cambridgeshire (UK Parliament constituency)
 William Cotton (MP for Newport, Isle of Wight) (in the 1590s), see Newport (Isle of Wight) (UK Parliament constituency)
 William Cotton (Archdeacon of Totnes) (fl. 1621), Anglican priest
 William Cotton (bishop) (died 1621), Bishop of Exeter, 1598–1621
 William Cotton (ironmaster) died 1675, husband of Anna Cotton
 William Cotton (banker) (1786–1866), Governor of the Bank of England, 1842–1845
 William Cotton (missionary) (1813–1879), Anglican priest and beekeeper
 William F. Cotton (1897–2006), central Louisiana businessman
 William Francis Cotton (died 1917), Irish politician
 William R. Cotton, American meteorologist
 Sir William Cotton (Lord Mayor) (1822–1902), British politician, Lord Mayor of London, Member of Parliament for City of London 1874–1885
 Will Cotton (born 1965), American painter
 Bill Cotton (1928–2008), British television producer
 Billy Cotton (1899–1969), bandleader, father of the above
 Billy Cotton (footballer, born 1894) (1894–1971), English soccer player

See also 
 Harold Cotton (ice hockey) (William Harold Cotton, 1902–1984), Canadian professional ice hockey player